Çadırlı (known as Şatrovka or Shatrovka until 2009) is a village in the Salyan Rayon of Azerbaijan.  The village forms part of the municipality of Qaraçala.

References 

Populated places in Salyan District (Azerbaijan)